Apple PowerCD is a  CD player sold by Apple Computer in 1993 and discontinued several years later. It was a re-badged Philips-designed product (Philips CDF-100) which was sold in addition to Apple's speakers and also included a remote control. The PowerCD was capable of reading Kodak photo CDs, data CDs and audio CDs. It can connect to Macintosh personal computers through SCSI and also to stereo systems and televisions.

History
With the success of the Apple Newton, in mid-1992 Apple Industrial Design Group created a division called Mac Like Things which was to focus on what they saw as a whole new market for Apple in consumer electronic devices. The PowerCD marked Apple's first stand-alone consumer-oriented product brought to market, which did not require a computer for use. It was analogous to Sony's Discman portable CD players of the time, however, unlike Sony's and most others, Apple's could also be used as computer peripheral as well. And while most desktop Macs at the time included built-in CD-ROMs, the PowerCD was designed to match the PowerBook series which would not include a built-in CD-ROM for several more years. Its ability to be operated under battery power alone made it not only a portable drive for computers, but gave it the added ability to be marketed as a stand-alone portable CD player. However, Mac Like Things was short-lived and by September 1992, it was folded into Apple's New Media Group having only brought to market the PowerCD and AppleDesign Powered Speakers series.

AppleDesign Powered Speakers

Along with the PowerCD, Apple released two versions of their desktop speakers: the AppleDesign Powered Speakers and the redesigned AppleDesign Powered Speakers II a year later. The original speakers came in Platinum gray to match Apple's desktop line, while the second generation were curvier and also came in a darker gray color designed to match the PowerBook line and PowerCD. Both were powered with an AC adapter and could be attached to any audio output source, with two separate inputs for the computer and an external CD player. Both had a headphone jack in the front of one speaker along with the volume control and an optional subwoofer connection port on some models.

Timeline of Apple products

See also
iPod
Apple QuickTake
Apple Interactive Television Box
Bandai Pippin

References

External links
Mac Guides
popcorn.cx - Apple PowerCD & AppleDesign Powered Speakers
Apple PowerCD 
Apple/PHILIPS CDP/PowerCD 

Apple Inc. hardware
Apple Inc. peripherals
Compact disc
Computer-related introductions in 1993